Aji Sunte Ho is an Indian Hindi reality television series, which premiered on 14 November 2016 and was broadcast on Zee TV. The series was produced by Shashi Sumeet Productions of Shashi Mittal and Sumeet Hukamchand Mittal. The series was aired on weekdays' nights.

Plot
The show welcomes couples from across the country over a session of fun and games, testing their compatibility.

Host
Pranoti Pradhan
Satish Sharma

References

External links
Official website

2016 Indian television series debuts
2017 Indian television series endings
Hindi-language television shows
Indian reality television series
Television shows set in Mumbai
Zee TV original programming
Indian television talk shows